The LaSalle–Wacker Building, at 221 North LaSalle Street (also known as 121 West Wacker Drive), is a 41-story skyscraper at the north end of the LaSalle Street canyon in the Loop community area of Chicago, Illinois, United States.

Design
Originally planned as a 37-story building, the developer bought an L-shaped building aside original lot and expanded the site. Clad in limestone and granite, the Holabird and Root-designed structure (Andrew Rebori was the associate architect) serves as an office building. When built, the beacon on the top of the building could be seen from as far as 200 miles. As with other buildings in Chicago, the structure is upwardly lit at night with moonlight, and the peak of building is typically lit in cobalt blue.  The nights illumination design was a common contemporary Chicago architectural theme, seen also in the Wrigley Building, Tribune Tower, Jewelers Building, Palmolive Building, and Chicago Board of Trade Building.

In popular culture
The building was used as a backdrop in the 2005 movie Batman Begins.  WFMT, America's first radio superstation, maintained studios in the building from 1954 until 1995.

See also
 Chicago architecture

Notes

External links
 Official website

Office buildings completed in 1930
Art Deco skyscrapers
Skyscraper office buildings in Chicago
Art Deco architecture in Illinois
Chicago school architecture in Illinois
1930 establishments in Illinois